Liga Sorocabana de Basquete, or simply LSB, as it is known, is a Brazilian basketball team from Sorocaba, São Paulo state. The team receives financial support from partners such as Case, Flextronics, Intermédica and Objetivo Sorocaba.

History
The team was founded in 1997, but the first conquest of only highlight came in 2011, when he reached the final of the Super Copa Brasil, losing to the team of the Tijuca Tênis Clube. But the team won the right to compete in the NBB 2011-2012. For the competition, LSB hired the American point guard Kenny Dawkins, who led the team throughout the championship to the eleventh place in the regular season. In the playoffs, LSB was beaten by Bauru, after a series by 3-0.

Roster

Honors

National
 Super Copa Brasil:
 Runner-up: 2011

References

External links
Official website 

Basketball teams in Brazil
Novo Basquete Brasil
Basketball teams established in 1997
1997 establishments in Brazil
Sorocaba